William Nygaard (born 16 March 1943) is the retired head of the Norwegian publishing company Aschehoug. He was also chairman of the Norwegian Broadcasting Corporation. He has two children.

Business career
From 1974 to 2010, he was the chief publisher of Aschehoug, Norway's second largest publishing house, which is owned by the Nygaard family. When he took this job he followed the footsteps of his father Mads Wiel Nygaard and grandfather William Martin Nygaard who was leading the company in earlier years, and the tradition continues since he left the job to his son, Mads Nygaard. William Nygaard was chairman of the Norwegian Publishers Association from 1987 to 1990. From 2010 to 2014, he was employed as a director of NRK (the state owned TV of Norway).

Assassination attempt
On 12 April 1989, Aschehoug and William Nygaard were responsible for publishing the Norwegian edition of Salman Rushdie's novel The Satanic Verses. This was two months after Ayatollah Khomeini issued the following fatwa against Salman Rushdie and his publishers:

I inform all zealous Muslims of the world that the author of the book entitled The Satanic Verses — which has been compiled, printed and published in opposition to Islam, the Prophet, and the Qur'an — and all those involved in its publication who were aware of its content, are sentenced to death. I call on all zealous Muslims to execute them quickly, wherever they may be found, so that no one else will dare to insult the Muslim sanctities. God Willing, whoever is killed on this path is a martyr.

Owing to the fatwa, direct threats were made against William Nygaard and translator Kari Risvik, and in the resulting controversy, Nygaard was given police protection for a period.

On the morning of 11 October 1993, Nygaard was shot three times outside his home in Dagaliveien in Oslo. Most people — including Nygaard  — link the incident to the fatwa. After several months of hospitalization, mostly at Sunnaas Hospital, Nygaard slowly recovered. In early October 2018, almost a quarter century after the attempted assassination, charges were made against the alleged perpetrators. Their names and nationalities were not publicized at the time. In November 2021 the two were identified as the Lebanese man Khaled Moussawi and an unnamed former Iranian diplomat.

Other positions
Both before and after the attack, William Nygaard has been an outspoken defender of free speech, and is a board member of the Norwegian division of International PEN. He is a member of the Norwegian Academy for Language and Literature.

He has been a member of the board of Norway's National Museum of Art, Architecture and Design. In 2010 he was elected chairman of the Norwegian Broadcasting Corporation.

Awards 

 1994 Fritt Ord Award.
 1998 Segerstedt award
 1998 knight of 1. class of St. Olavs Orden
 1998 (with Salman Rushdie) honorary doctor at Universitetet i Tromsø
 2019 Gunnar Sønstebys award

References

1943 births
Living people
Norwegian publishers (people)
Norwegian victims of crime
Islamic terrorism and Norway
Members of the Norwegian Academy
Chairs of NRK